SCORE Class 7SX is a stock production Mini Pickup class that competes in the SCORE off-road race series races including the Baja 1000, Baja 500, Baja Sur 500, San Felipe 250, and the SCORE Desert Challenge.

This class is a stock production class and all components must remain stock except some modifications allowed.

Vehicle Description
Built from a two or four-wheel drive mini or mid-sized pickup truck.  Engine displacement may not exceed 4000cc.

Vehicles must have been series produced in quantities of at least 5000 units within a 12-month period and be readily available to the general public in the U.S.A. Vehicle must be marketed as mini or mid-sized pickups.

Class Requirements

Engine
Engine must be of the same manufacturer, basic design with a maximum of 6 cylinders.

Suspension
Suspension must be of the same basic design and concept as originally produced. Suspension parts may be strengthened, reinforced or replaced.

Body
Body must maintain original shape, size, configuration and appearance. Vehicles must weight 3000lbs minimum.

References

SCORE International (2011). "2011-2015 Off-Road Racing Rules and Regulations".
SCORE International. " 2009 New Classes & Existing Class Rule Amendments"

External links
Official SCORE International website
Official SCORE International Journal
Official SCORE International Carbon TV channel